Tadeusz Sokołowski (25 September 1905 – 6 February 1943) was a Polish equestrian. He competed in two events at the 1936 Summer Olympics. He was killed by the Gestapo during World War II.

References

External links
 

1905 births
1943 deaths
Polish male equestrians
Olympic equestrians of Poland
Equestrians at the 1936 Summer Olympics
Sportspeople from Grodno
Polish civilians killed in World War II
Polish people executed by Nazi Germany